Arthur Municipal Airport  is a city-owned public-use airport located one nautical mile (1.15 mi, 1.85 km) southwest of the central business district of Arthur, in Arthur County, Nebraska, United States.

Facilities and aircraft 
It has one runway designated 6/24 with a turf surface measuring 2,700 by 200 feet (823 x 61 m). For the 12-month period ending June 24, 2003, the airport had 25 general aviation aircraft operations: 60% local and 40% transient.

References

External links 
 Aerial photo as of 12 May 1999 from USGS The National Map 
 Arthur Municipal Airport (38V)  at SkyVector

Defunct airports in Nebraska
Airports in Nebraska
Buildings and structures in Arthur County, Nebraska
Transportation in Arthur County, Nebraska